Dorli Hofrichter (born 8 March 1935) is an Austrian athlete. She competed in the women's discus throw at the 1960 Summer Olympics.

References

1935 births
Living people
Athletes (track and field) at the 1960 Summer Olympics
Austrian female discus throwers
Olympic athletes of Austria
Place of birth missing (living people)